Bhoot Police is a 2021 Indian Hindi-language horror comedy film, directed by Pavan Kirpalani and produced by Ramesh Taurani and Akshai Puri. The film stars  Saif Ali Khan, Arjun Kapoor, Jacqueline Fernandez, Yami Gautam and Javed Jaffrey, and premiered on 10 September 2021 on Disney+ Hotstar.

Plot

Two brothers, Vibhooti and Chiraunji run an exorcist business and together travel all over the country. They are famous as Ullat Baba and sons, though know nothing about supernatural beings and exorcism and thrive only on the superstitions of people.

The movie starts with them arriving in a village in Rajasthan to perform an exorcism on a young girl who was being  possessed by her late grandfather. However, Vibhooti soon realizes that the girl was faking the possession to which she admits. Turns out, her parents were forcing her to get married while she wanted to continue her studies. The brothers agree to help her and although Chiraunji is against the illicit ways his brother uses, the duo performs a fake exorcism.

Later, the brothers arrive at a Tantric fair in search of new cases. When Vibhooti is busy with one of the clients, Chiraunji leaves the camp with their father's book to concentrate on deciphering it. However, the script used in the book is an ancient language that no one knows how to read. Defeated and tired, Chiraunji asks his father to show him a sign and help him, who subtly does so by making the book roll down the hill and stop at the feet of a girl While Chiraunji takes it from her, he accidentally finds the key to reading the ancient book and runs off to inform his brother. Vibhooti is disinterested at first and they have a comical spat when suddenly Vibhooti sees a Police Inspector named Chedilal looking for them. Vibhooti asks Chiraunji to pack all the stuff and leave for the van while he buys time for them to escape. Near the van, Chiraunji finds the same girl with another Baba (goggle Baba) under the disguise of Ullat baba. Upset over the fraudster, he tells the girl the truth about them being the original Ullat Baba and sons and also fights off Goggle Baba's men. In a matter of minutes, Vibhooti also arrives and the three leave for Dharamshala.

The girl, Maya, tells them how 27 years ago their father, the infamous Ullat Baba had helped her father by chasing away a paranormal entity known as "kichkandi" from their tea estate in Dharamshala. Now the same Kichkandi is back and the workers are scared to work at the factory after nightfall. The van arrives in the village and everyone, except for Maya's sister Kanika warmly welcomes the duo. While Chiraunji interviews the village folk, who each have different accounts of being haunted by the Kichkandi, Vibhooti entertains a little girl named Teetli. Maya sees a photo of Ullat Baba and sees one person who's still around, a man named Santo.

The brothers visit Santo, who lives in a Monastery. Santo recalls how 27 years ago, his wife was possessed by the Kichkandi, killing two people, and permanently blinding Santo. Ullat Baba came, and performed an exorcism in the forest, trapping the spirit of the Kichkandi in a bone in a jar, and securing it in a burned tree.  However, Santo's wife died. The brothers go to the forest and find the same jar. Vibhooti, who is a skeptic of the supernatural, breaks open the jar and leaves the bone in the forest. Maya's dog, Shunko comes with the bone in the mouth to Maya's Bedroom as a result Maya gets possessed. Vibhooti, still skeptical, finds that the manager was pretending to be the original ghost to scare off the tea villagers so Kanika can convince her sister into selling off their estate. Vibhooti agrees to perform a fake exorcism in exchange for money. During the fake exorcism, Vibhooti spikes Chiaruanji's drink without his knowledge to create a dramatic scenario for the villagers to believe. Chiraunji learns of this and the two brothers get into an altercation and decide to go their separate ways.

Vibhooti encounters Titli again and while running away from Chedi, he realizes that Titli is indeed a ghost and starts to believe in ghosts himself. Kichkandi who now possesses Maya attacks Chiraunji and Chiraunji accidentally transfers the spirit from Maya's to Vibhooti's body when he meant to transfer it to himself. Chiraunji, with the help of his father's knowledge, sees that Kichkandi is actually Titli's mother and they were both killed by the British owners of the land, Kichkandi was burnt alive while Titli was shot when she was waiting for her mother. Kichkandi is looking for her daughter. The brother and the rest of the gang duo help Titli and Kichkandi reunite and the spirits fade away into the sky. Maya and Kanika reaffirm their sisterly bond. The screen cuts to black and the song "Aayi Aayi Bhoot Police" plays. Then we see Chedilal on phone with an unknown person, who asks him if the Bhoot Police is ready to take a case involving werewolves and vampires. Chedilal tells him to first book three business class tickets to Scotland, hinting at a sequel.

Cast
 Saif Ali Khan as Vibhooti "Vibhu" Vaidya
 Arjun Kapoor as Chiraunji "Chiku" Vaidya
 Jacqueline Fernandez as Kanika "Kanu" Kulbhushan
 Yami Gautam as Maya "Mayu" Kulbhushan
 Javed Jaffrey as Inspector Chedilal
 Amit Mistry as GM Hari Kumar
 Jamie Lever as Lata
 Saurabh Sachdeva as Umedji Vaidya a.k.a. Ullat Baba
 Yashaswini Dayama as Guddi
 Girish Kulkarni as Santo
 Rupesh Tillu as Vinod
 Rajpal Yadav as Goggal Baba (special appearance) 
 Kalsang Dolma as Kichkandi
 Youngykar Dolma as Titli Meena

Production
The principal photography commenced on 4 November 2020 in Dharamshala.

Soundtrack 

The music of film was composed by Sachin–Jigar while lyrics written by Kumaar and Priya Saraiya.

Reception
The film met with mixed to positive reviews from critics, praising its plot, the performances of the cast (particularly Saif Ali Khan and Yami Gautam Dhar), humour, visuals but criticized its screenplay.

Bollywood Bubble gave the film 4 stars out of 5, “Surprisingly though, Bhoot Police was refreshingly witty, using viral trends as inside jokes, which will definitely crack you up ". Bollywood Hungama gave it a rating of 3 stars out of 5 and wrote , "Pavan Kirpalani's story gives a deja vu of Stree and Roohi. But unlike the other two films, it focuses on ghostbusters and that gives a unique touch." Koimoi gave it a positive review, rating of 3 stars out of 5 and said , "If You’ve Got It, Haunt It’ & Saif Ali Khan Does The Same!". Firstpost gave it a rating of 3 stars out of 5 and wrote, "Saif Ali Khan sizzles in a breezy horror comedy."

Filmibeat gave it 3 stars out of 5 and wrote, "If you dive into Bhoot Police with the hope of feeling some 'chills', you might get disappointed. Rest assured, the film is a hoot with Saif Ali Khan's entertaining antics." Indian express gave it a rating of 2.5 stars out of 5 and wrote, "Saif Ali Khan is having a blast, and makes sure we do too."

NDTV gave it a rating of 2.5 stars out of 5 stars and wrote , Saif Ali Khan Brings His Flair For Comedy To Breezy Caper Film.
Times of India gave it 2 stars out of 5 and wrote,"A childish horror comedy."

References

External links 
 
 

Disney+ Hotstar original films
2021 films
Films set in Rajasthan
Films set in Himachal Pradesh
Films shot in Himachal Pradesh
Indian comedy horror films
2020s Hindi-language films
2021 comedy horror films